Alexander Gerard "Sander" van de Streek (born 24 March 1993) is a Dutch professional footballer who plays as a midfielder for Eredivisie club Utrecht. He formerly played for Vitesse, Flora Tallinn and Cambuur.

Career

Vitesse
Born in Barneveld, Gelderland, Netherlands, Van de Streek began playing football for SDV Barneveld before joining Vitesse in 2011. In the preliminary rounds of the 2012–13 UEFA Europa League, Van de Streek was part of the first-team squad for the away leg against Lokomotiv Plovdiv but he missed the plane, taking part on the bench instead.

Flora Tallinn (loan)
In February 2013, Van de Streek was sent on loan to Flora Tallinn for the 2013 season – which ran until November – with Vitesse having the option of ending the loan earlier. He made his debut on 2 March 2013 in the season opener against JK Tallinna Kalev. On 9 March, he scored his first goals for Flora against Paide Linnameeskond – a hat-trick – in the 6–0 away win. On 4 July, Van de Streek made his European debut; in the Europa League qualifier against FK Kukësi he played the entire match. Van de Streek made 36 total appearances for Flora, scoring eight goals as the club won the 2012–13 Estonian Cup.

Cambuur
Without having made an official appearance for the Vitesse first team, Van de Streek moved to SC Cambuur on a free transfer on 1 May 2014, signing a two-year contract with an option for an additional year. He made his Eredivisie debut on 22 August 2014 against Heracles Almelo. He scored his first goal in his second match for Cambuur, on 14 September against FC Groningen. Only a few minutes after on as a substitute for Daniël de Ridder into the second half, he scored to secure his team's 3–0 win. On 15 February 2015, he scored his first brace in a 2–1 win over rivals SC Heerenveen. He finished the season with 33 appearances in all competitions, in which he scored seven goals.

In his second season at the club, he made 33 total appearances in which he scored four goals, as Cambuur suffered relegation to the second-tier Eerste Divisie.

During the 2016–17 season, his first in the second division, he distinguished himself by scoring a total of 22 goals, including two hat-tricks – both scored against TOP Oss.

Utrecht
On 2 June 2017, it was announced that Van de Streek would sign with FC Utrecht on a three-year deal. He made his debut on 13 July 2017 in a Europa League qualifier against Valletta, starting in the 0–0 draw. During the 2017–18 season he scored a total of 10 goals, including a brace away against Roda JC Kerkrade. His goals made him the second highest goalscorer in his team that season, only behind Zakaria Labyad.

At the end of the 2020–21 season, Van de Streek was voted Utrecht Player of the Season by the fans, winning the Di Tommaso Trophy.

Honours
Flora Tallinn
 Estonian Cup: 2012–13

References

1993 births
Living people
People from Barneveld
Footballers from Gelderland
Association football midfielders
Dutch footballers
SBV Vitesse players
FC Flora players
SC Cambuur players
FC Utrecht players
Eredivisie players
Eerste Divisie players
Meistriliiga players
Expatriate footballers in Estonia
Dutch expatriate footballers
Dutch expatriate sportspeople in Estonia